Posht Tappeh is a village in Kakasharaf Rural District, in the Central District of Khorramabad County, Lorestan Province, Iran. At the 2006 census, its population was 51, in 10 families.

References 

Towns and villages in Khorramabad County